The Dum Dum Arsenal was a British military facility located near the town of Dum Dum in modern West Bengal, India.

The arsenal was at the centre of the Indian Rebellion of 1857, caused in part by rumours that the paper cartridges for their muzzle-loading rifles, which they were expected to bite open, were greased with pig lard (a problem for Muslims) or cow fat (a problem for Hindus).

It was at this arsenal that Captain Neville Bertie-Clay developed the .303-inch Mark II Special cartridge, incorporating the original so-called  "Dum-dum bullet", a soft-point bullet designed to mushroom on striking. This was the first in a series of expanding bullets developed by the British for military use. They were later banned in warfare by the Hague Convention as being "too inhumane."

On 7 December 1908, a serious, accidental explosion occurred at the Dum Dum arsenal, resulting in the death or serious injury to about 50 workers.

References

Military industrial facilities of the United Kingdom
Bengal Presidency
1857 in British India